MTV Brasil programming is largely targeted to teenagers and young adults, based mostly on comedy and music shows, but also deals with fashion, health, politics and the environment.

The music videos and live shows aired on MTV Brasil focus on the international rock and pop scenes and on Brazilian pop rock and independent rock bands.

Former programs

Music 
 Acesso MTV (2009–13)
 MTV1 (2012–13)
 My MTV (2012–13)
 Para Gostar de Música (2012–13)
 Top 10 MTV (2008–13)
 Top 20 Brasil (1990–2006; 2013)

Comedy 
Hermes & Renato (1999–2010, 2013)
Fudêncio e Seus Amigos (2005-2011)
 Furo MTV (2009–13)
 Infortúnio com Funérea (2009–13)

Entertainment 
 IT MTV (2010–13)
 MTV sem Vergonha (2012–13)
 PC na TV (2011–13)

International shows 
 Beavis and Butt-Head (2012–13)
 [[MTV Live HD|MTV Live]]
 MTV World Stage

Award shows 
 Europe Music Awards
 Movie Awards
 Video Music Awards
 Video Music Brasil

Other 
Beija Sapo

References

External links 
 MTV Brasil's shows

Lists of television series by network